is the fourth studio album by Bump of Chicken, released on August 25, 2004. It included the singles "Snow Smile", "Lost Man/Sailing Day", "Only Lonely Glory", and "Sharin no Uta". The album peaked at #1 on Oricon Weekly Charts and was #19 on the 2004 Oricon Top 100 Albums.

Track listing
All tracks written by Fujiwara Motoo.
"asgard" – 0:39
 (Album version) – 4:51
 – 3:06
 – 5:49
"embrace" – 5:31
"sailing day" – 4:05
 – 5:18
 – 4:26
 – 5:07
 – 4:22
"fire sign" – 5:13
 – 5:49
 – 5:04
"midgard" – 0:41
"O-to-ga-me Heart" (Hidden track) – 6:31

Personnel
Fujiwara Motoo – Guitar, vocals
Masukawa Hiroaki – Guitar
Naoi Yoshifumi – Bass
Masu Hideo – Drums

References

External links
Yggdrasil at the official Bump of Chicken website.

2004 albums
Bump of Chicken albums
Japanese-language albums
Norse mythology in music